The Journal of Land Use & Environmental Law is published twice a year at the Florida State University College of Law. Founded in 1983, it is Florida's first and only student publication in the field.  The law review ranks among the top environmental and land use law journals based on citations.

The Journal is edited and published entirely by law students at Florida State University College of Law.  It is managed by an executive board popularly elected annually by the members.

References

External links
 

American law journals
Florida State University
Publications established in 1983
Environmental law journals
Urban studies and planning journals
Law journals edited by students
Land use